Arno Gunther Motulsky (5 July 1923 – 17 January 2018) was a professor of medical genetics and genome sciences at the University of Washington. Through his research, writing and mentoring, he helped create and define the field of medical genetics. He is also known as the "father of pharmacogenomics" (the study of how drug action and metabolism differ among people due to genetic variability) based on his report in 1957 of negative drug responses in some patients depending upon their genetics at critical enzymes.[2]

Dr. Motulsky joined the faculty at the University of Washington School of Medicine in 1953. In 1957 he founded The Division of Medical Genetics at the University of Washington in 1957. Over his career Dr. Motulsky made many significant contributions to research, patient care and education in human genetics. He was noted for his work on blood diseases, the heritability of lipid disorders, the role of genetic variation in disease, and genetic reasons why people differ in their responses to medications and environmental substances.

Early life 

Arno Motulsky was born in Fischhausen near Königsberg, East Prussia to Jewish parents, Hermann and Rena (Sass) Motulsky.

As the Nazis consolidated power and adopted anti-Semitic laws, Arno's father Hermann, a merchant in Fischhausen, attempted to resist. Offended by the public display in the town square of Der Stürmer, the virulently anti-Semitic, pro-Nazi newspaper, he forged a letter to the local Nazi Party branch directing them to remove the Stürmer display boxes. The police traced the letter to him, and he served time in prison for his dissidence. Hermann was later pressured by the mayor of Fischhausen to sell his store and other property at undervalued prices to an “Aryan” buyer. The family relocated to Hamburg, living off savings as they explored how and when to emigrate.

In June 1938, Hermann was arrested again as part of the Juni-Aktion, a precursor to Kristallnacht. He was imprisoned in Sachsenhausen concentration camp for two months, and released on condition he leave Germany. He was forced to emigrate without his family in October 1938, bound for Cuba.

At age 15 in 1939, Arno along with his mother and younger siblings, already on a waiting list for a visa to enter US, obtained a landing permit to join his father in Cuba. With more than 900 other Jewish refugees, the family embarked on the ship the MS St. Louis from Hamburg to Havana.

Along with most other passengers, the Motulskys’ permit to enter Cuba was fraudulently sold by corrupt officials, and Cuba did not allow the refugees to disembark. The captain then asked to land in a US port with the refugees, but the US government refused them entry and safety, as did Canada and other Western Hemisphere nations. The St. Louis was forced to head back towards Germany. A few days before the ship was to land again in Hamburg, four countries agreed to take the refugees. By lots, the passengers were divided among England, France, Belgium, and Netherlands. Arno's family was sent to Belgium.

A year later, the Germans invaded Belgium, and 16-year-old Arno was arrested May 10, 1940 by the Belgians for being a German ‘‘enemy alien.’’ He was separated from his family and sent to French internment camps at Le Vigeant, St. Cyprien and then the Gurs internment camp in southern France.  Days before his 18th birthday, he was able to arrange to leave France in June 1941. From Lisbon, he sailed to the United States, where he arrived in August 1941. He wrote a memoir of his experiences from 1939 1941 and talked about these experiences in a -hour interview with the USC Shoah Foundation

Two years later, he was overjoyed to learn that his mother, brother and sister were in Switzerland, unharmed. A few years later, the family was reunited in Chicago.

Dr. Motulsky met his future wife Gretel Stern (born in 1924, also from Germany) in 1943 in the night classes they both attended at a YMCA college. He attended Yale University as part of the U.S. Army accelerated program, earned his M.D from University of Illinois, Chicago in 1947, and completed his residency with Karl Singer at the Michael Reese Hospital in Chicago where he conducted hematology research.

Career 
In 1953, he joined the faculty of the University of Washington, where he established the Division of Medical Genetics in 1957. That year Stanley Gartler became the first person to join Dr. Motulsky in medical genetics.

Beginning in 1961 Dr. Motulsky began mentoring postdoctoral trainees in medical genetics, including Robert Sparks, Philip J. Fialkow, Charles Epstein, Frederick Hecht, David E. Comings, Judith Goslin Hall, Gilbert S. Omenn, George Stamatoyannopoulos and Joseph L. Goldstein. These trainees went on to establish genetics programs of their own in a number of medical schools. They also contributed significantly to research in genetics. For example, when Joseph L. Goldstein arrived to train at the University of Washington in 1970, Dr. Motulsky suggested that he study lipid levels in people.  They looked at the relatives of people who suffered heart disease from hardening of the arteries. Along with other scientists, they proposed that some families had an inherited tendency towards high levels of harmful blood fats.  In 1985 Dr. Motulsky proudly watched Dr. Goldstein accept the Nobel Prize in Physiology or Medicine with Dr. Michael Brown “for their discoveries concerning the regulation of cholesterol metabolism.”

Dr. Motulsky's professional interests included ecogenetics (the variable reactions to environmental factors based on inherited traits), multifactorial diseases, the mechanisms of iron-overload disorders, the regulation of immunity, genetic linkage, bioethics (including the ethics of abortion for genetic anomalies), the genetics of hypertension and alcoholism, and genetic variation in color vision (with the late Samir Deeb) and pesticide metabolism (with Clement Furlong).

He trained several generations of medical genetic scientists and clinicians, and supported the roles of genetic counselors.  Dr. Motulsky's textbook, Human Genetics and Approaches, was initially co-authored with the late Friedrich Vogel and first released in 1979.  It has been translated into Italian, Japanese, Chinese, and Russian. He was also the co-editor of The Genetic Basis of Common Diseases.  He was an author and editor of the book, Genetic Diseases Among Ashkenazi Jews.

Dr.  Motulsky was a leader in national and international venues in science policy and advocacy. He explained to non-scientists the implications of pending policy decisions. He served on Presidential Commissions, World Health Organization expert advisory panels, National Research Council Committees, and many committees for the National Academy of Sciences and the National Academy of Medicine, including the President's Commission on Bioethics; committees on nutrition,  genetic testing, and gene therapy; on the Nuclear Regulatory Commission  Science Council for Atomic Bomb Survivor Studies in Japan;  and on scientific advisory boards of the Howard Hughes and Markey Foundations.

His many national and international awards included the induction into the American Society for Clinical Investigation, National Academy of Medicine, National Academy of Arts and Sciences, and American Philosophical Society; Fellow, American Association for the Advancement of Science; Alexander von Humboldt Award; Lifetime Achievement Award, American College of Medical Genetics;  the William Allen Memorial Award,  Excellence in Education Award, and Victor A. McKusick Leadership Awards of the American Society of Human Genetics.

Legacy 
In his final publication, co-written with Mary-Claire King, a UW professor of genome sciences known for discoveries in breast cancer genetics, he summarized his life and career highlights. Much of this memoir was based on an interview done as part of the Conversations in Genetics series. Obituaries were published in the New York Times, American Journal of Human Genetics.  American Journal of Medical Genetics, Genetics in Medicine, the Journal of Clinical investigation, the Lancet, the Scientist, the Pharmacologist, the British Journal of Medicine, the National Academy of Sciences, and UW Medicine.

References

External links

1923 births
2018 deaths
People from Primorsk, Kaliningrad Oblast
People from East Prussia
American geneticists
Medical geneticists
Jewish emigrants from Nazi Germany to the United States
Gurs internment camp survivors
American Journal of Human Genetics editors
Members of the National Academy of Medicine